Bad Vilbel is a spa town in Hesse (Hessen), Germany, famous for its many mineral water springs. Bad Vilbel is the largest town in the Wetteraukreis district and part of the Frankfurt Rhein-Main urban area with its city center being located 8 km northeast of downtown Frankfurt am Main at the banks of the river Nidda.

History
Bad Vilbel was founded in 774 (first written document) but much older artefacts were found in the area. In 1848 during railway works, a Roman villa was unearthed with a
Thermae and a Mosaic. A replica of this mosaic is presented in a modern exhibition in the spa gardens.

20th Century

The town Vilbel got the label "Bad" (spa) in 1948 for its numerous mineral springs. The health spa operations stopped in the 1960s but the mineral water industry connected more springs of the Wetterau by pipelines to the bottling plant of Hassia in Bad Vilbel.  
The hessian government reform formed 1971/72 Bad Vilbel (with Heilsberg), Dortelweil, Gronau and Massenheim to the new city Bad Vilbel. Since 1997 great areas have been developed for living and business, like the residential area of Dortelweil-West or the commercial park Quellenpark between Bad Vilbel, Massenheim and Dortelweil.

Mayor
The Current Mayor is Sebastian Wysocki(born 1985) of the Christian Democratic Union of Germany (CDU). He was elected in March 2022.

Transport
Bad Vilbel has four railway stations (Bad Vilbel, Bad Vilbel Süd and Dortelweil on the Main–Weser Railway and Gronau on the Vilbel–Glauburg-Stockheim railway) served by Frankfurt's local transport network (S-Bahn line S 6 and RE Line 34). It has access to the A661 autobahn and the highway B3.

Furthermore, Bad Vilbel has several local bus lines called Vilbus connecting the city center to the neighborhoods. Additional connections to Frankfurt am Main with the bus line 30 and with Offenbach am Main with the fast bus line X97.

Twin towns – sister cities

Bad Vilbel is twinned with:
 Brotterode-Trusetal, Germany (1990)
 Eldoret, Kenya (1982)
 Glossop, England, United Kingdom (1987)
 Moulins, France (1990)

See also
 Bad Vilbel station
 English electronic music duo Autechre released a song entitled Second Bad Vilbel on their EP Anvil Vapre. The title derives from the town's twinning with Glossop, an area the group would have passed en route to Sheffield, from their homes in Rochdale.
 Asteroid (340980) Bad Vilbel discovered 2007 by Uwe Süßenberger .

Notable people

Born in Bad Vilbel 

 Wilhelm von Finck (1848–1924),  banker and co-founder of the Alliance Insurance
 Friedel Lutz (born 1939), former national soccer player
 Thomas Stöhr (born 1966), jurist and major of Bad Vilbel since 2003
 Kathrin Anders (born 1982), German politician (The Greens), Members of the Landtag of Hesse since 2019

Linked to Bad Vilbel 
 Friedrich Carl Michael Grosholz (1810–1888), co-founder of Bad Vilbel bottled water industry
 Bernhard Rechthien (1876–1941), mayor of Bad Vilbel 1919–1928
 Klaus Havenstein (1922–1998), actor and television presenter, from 1990 to 1992 director of the Castle Festival Bad Vilbel
 Jürgen Sparwasser (born 1948), is a retired German football player and later briefly a football manager living in Bad Vilbel. He gained fame as East Germany football player at the 1974 FIFA World Cup finals, where he scored the winning goal in a politically prestigious match against West Germany

References

External links

 Official site 

Spa towns in Germany
Wetteraukreis